Cosne-Cours-sur-Loire is a commune in the Nièvre department in central France. The commune was formed in 1973 by the merger of the former communes Cosne-sur-Loire and Cours.

Geography

Cosne-Cours-sur-Loire lies on the right bank of the Loire at its confluence with the Nohain, about 50 km northwest of Nevers. Cosne-sur-Loire station has rail connections to Nevers, Montargis and Paris. The A77 autoroute (Montargis–Nevers) passes east of the town.

History
Cosne is mentioned in the 3rd-century Antonine Itinerary under the name of Condate, but it was not until the Middle Ages that it rose into importance as a military post. In the 12th century the bishop of Auxerre and the Count of Nevers agreed to a division of the supremacy over the town and its territory.

Demographics
As of 2018, the estimated population was 9,741.

Notable buildings
The church of St Aignan is a building of the 12th century, restored in the 16th and 18th centuries. The only portions in the Romanesque style are the apse and the north-west portal. It formerly belonged to a Benedictine priory depending on the abbey of La Charité.

Notable residents

 Roger Marie Bricoux, cellist on the

International relations

Cosne-Cours-sur-Loire is twinned with:

See also
Communes of the Nièvre department

References

External links

Official website 
 Tourism Office

Communes of Nièvre
Subprefectures in France
Nièvre communes articles needing translation from French Wikipedia